IISJ may refer to:
International Indian School Jeddah
India International School in Japan